Ashok  Dinda (born 25 March 1984) is a former legendary Indian cricketer and as of 2021 a Member of the Legislative Assembly. Dinda is a member of the Bharatiya Janata Party and represents the Moyna constituency. He played cricket for Bengal and Goa in the Ranji Trophy and for a variety of Indian Premier League sides. He retired from all forms of cricket on 2 February 2021.

Early and domestic career 
In the 2012 Indian Premier League, Dinda joined the Pune Warriors India franchise.

He was the leading wicket-taker for Bengal in the 2017–18 Ranji Trophy, with 35 dismissals in eight matches. In July 2018, Dinda was named in the squad for India Green for the 2018–19 Duleep Trophy. He was also the leading wicket-taker for Bengal in the 2018–19 Ranji Trophy, with 28 dismissals in eight matches. On 24 December 2019, Ashok Dinda was axed from the squad due to 'disciplinary reasons' ahead of Bengal's Elite Group A game versus Andhra. On 10 November 2020, Dinda confirmed that his career with Bengal was over. On 15 December 2020, he decided to play for Goa for the 2020–21 season.

International career 
Dinda made his T20 international Debut for India on 9 December 2009 against Sri Lanka at Nagpur. He took the wicket of Sanath Jayasuriya. Dinda ended up with figures of 1/34 in 3 overs. While batting, he scored 19 runs off 20 deliveries before being bowled by Tillakaratne Dilshan.

Dinda made his ODI debut against Zimbabwe in June 2010. He bowled 7.2 overs and took 0/49. He was picked for the 2010 Asia Cup squad in Sri Lanka. However, Dinda played only one game in that tournament, a group stage match against Sri Lanka, in which he ended up with figures of 0/39 in 5 overs.

Political career
Dinda is a member of the Bharatiya Janata Party. He was selected as a candidate in Moyna (Vidhan Sabha constituency) in the 2021 West Bengal Legislative Assembly election. He was also elected as MLA in Moyna (Vidhan Sabha constituency).

References

External links

Indian cricketers
India One Day International cricketers
India Twenty20 International cricketers
Bengal cricketers
Royal Challengers Bangalore cricketers
Kolkata Knight Riders cricketers
Delhi Capitals cricketers
East Zone cricketers
1984 births
Living people
Cricketers from Kolkata
People from Purba Medinipur district
Pune Warriors India cricketers
India Blue cricketers
India Green cricketers
India Red cricketers
Rising Pune Supergiant cricketers
Bharatiya Janata Party politicians from West Bengal
West Bengal MLAs 2021–2026